This is a list of cricketers who played for the Pakistan Air Force cricket team in first-class cricket matches. The side played a total of eight first-class matches between 1969 and 1975. The side continues to play non-first-class cricket today. Only those players who played in first-class matches for the side are included below.

A

D

F

G

H

I

J

K

M

N

S

T

Z

Notes

References

Pakistan Air Force cricketers
Pakistan Air Force